is a video game brand. Masaya was initially established by Japanese entertainment company Nippon Computer Systems (NCS) in 1984 to take part in the video game market. The brand name was transferred to Extreme in November 2014.

Video games

PC-8801
Elthlead (1987)

PC Engine
Gaia no Monshou (1988)
Moto Roader (1989) 
Kaizō Chōjin Shubibinman (1989)
Ganbare! Golf Boys (1989)
Energy (1989)
Double Dungeons (1989) 
ROM ROM Stadium (CD-ROM², 1989) 
Gaiflame (1990)
Hisou Kihei χserd (1990)
Nazo no Masquerade (1990)
Sol Bianca (CD-ROM², 1990) 
Kickball (1990)
Ranma ½ (CD-ROM², 1990) 
Wallaby!! (1990)
Cyber City Oedo 808: Attribute of the Beast (CD-ROM², 1991) 
Moto Roader II (1991)
L-Dis (CD-ROM², 1991)
Shockman (1991) 
Dragon Egg (1991)
Ranma ½: Toraware no Hanayome (CD-ROM², 1991) 
Kaizō Chōjin Shubibinman 3: Ikai no Princess (CD-ROM², 1992) 
Mamono Hunter Yōko: Makai kara no Tenkōsei (CD-ROM², 1992) 
The Super Dimension Fortress Macross 2036 (Super CD-ROM², 1992) 
Ranma ½: Datou, Ganso Musabetsu Kakutou-ryuu! (Super CD-ROM², 1992) 
The Super Dimension Fortress Macross: Eternal Love Song (Super CD-ROM², 1992) 
Moto Roader MC (Super CD-ROM², 1992) 
Cho Aniki (Super CD-ROM², 1992) 
Mamono Hunter Yōko: Tooki Yobigoe (Super CD-ROM², 1993) 
Langrisser: The Descendants of Light (Super CD-ROM², 1993)
Ai Cho Aniki (Super CD-ROM², 1995)

Sega Genesis
Shove It! ...The Warehouse Game (1990)
Target Earth (1990)
Hellfire (1990)
Trampoline Terror! (1990)
Star Cruiser (1990)
Gynoug (1991)
Mamono Hunter Yōko: Dai 7 no Keishō (1991) 
Warsong (1991) 
Sorcerer's Kingdom (1992)
Gley Lancer (1992) 
Vixen 357 (1992) 
Ranma ½: Byakuran Aika (Mega-CD, 1992) 
Langrisser II (1994)

Game Boy
After Burst (1990)
Winner's Horse (1991)
Janken Man (1991)
Prince of Persia (1992) 
Battletoads (1994)
Zen-Nippon Pro Wrestling Jet (1994)

Game Gear
Head Buster (1991)

NES
Battletoads (1991)
Double Moon Densetsu (1992)

Super NES
Prince of Persia (1992) 
Cybernator (1992) 
Ranma ½: Hard Battle (1992)
Zen Nippon Pro Wrestling (1993)
Zen-Nippon Pro Wrestling Dash: Sekai Saikyō Tag (1993)
Battletoads in Battlemaniacs (1994) 
Araiguma Rascal: Raccoon Rascal (1994) 
Zen-Nippon Pro Wrestling: Fight da Pon! (1994)
Bike Daisuki! Hashiriya Kon – Rider's Spirits (1994) 
Power of the Hired (1994)
Zen-Nippon Pro Wrestling 2: 3–4 Budōkan (1995)
Der Langrisser (1995) 
Cho Aniki Bakuretsu Ranto-hen (1995) 
Kaizou Choujin Schbibinman Zero (1997) 
Ring Ni Kakero (1998)

PC-FX
Der Langrisser FX (1996)

Playstation
Cho Aniki: Kyuukyoku Muteki Ginga Saikyou Otoko (1995)
Langrisser I & II (1997)
Dream Generation: Koi ka? Shigoto ka!?... (1998)
Arubarea no Otome ~Uruwashi no Seishikitachi~ (1998)
Langrisser IV & V Final Edition (1999)
Assault Suits Valken 2 (1999)

Sega Saturn
Cho Aniki: Kyuukyoku Muteki Ginga Saikyou Otoko (1996)
Langrisser III (1996)
Assault Suit Leynos 2 (1997)
Langrisser IV (1997)
Langrisser: Dramatic Edition (1998)
Langrisser V: The End of Legend (1998)
Dream Generation: Koi ka? Shigoto ka!?... (1998)
Langrisser Tribute (1998)

Dreamcast
Langrisser Millennium (1999)

Microsoft Windows
Qualia 3: Multi Agent (2014)

References

External links
 NCS Masaya at UVL
 MobyGames.com: Masaya 
 MobyGames.com: NCS Corporation 
 GameFAQs.com: List of NCS games

Video game companies of Japan
Video game development companies
Video game publishers
Video game companies established in 1985
Japanese companies established in 1985